Major General Albert Whitney Waldron (January 13, 1892 – June 21, 1961) was a United States Army officer who served during World War II. He briefly replaced Major General Edwin F. Harding as the commander of the 32nd Infantry Division during the Battle of Buna–Gona and was wounded in the shoulder on 5 December 1942 after being shot by a sniper. He received the Distinguished Service Cross and the Army Distinguished Service Medal for his actions during the war.

Early military career

Albert Whitney Waldron was born on January 13, 1892, in Rochester, New York. He attended the United States Military Academy at West Point, New York, in 1911 and graduated four years later as a part of "the class the stars fell on" (59 members of this class became general officers during World War II). For example: Dwight D. Eisenhower, Omar Bradley, James Van Fleet, Henry Aurand, Stafford LeRoy Irwin, Paul J. Mueller, John W. Leonard, William E. R. Covell, Henry Aurand, Joseph T. McNarney, Roscoe B. Woodruff, Joseph May Swing, A. Arnim White, Thomas B. Larkin, and others. Waldron was commissioned a second lieutenant in United States Army Field Artillery Branch on June 12, 1915.

His first military assignment was with 4th Field Artillery Regiment stationed at Texas City, Texas. His unit was subsequently transferred to the Brownsville, Texas, where he served until March 1916, when he participated in Pancho Villa Expedition. After seven months of service in Mexico, Waldron returned to the United States in October 1916 and was stationed at Eagle Pass, Texas.

Decorations
Here is Major General Albert W. Waldron´s ribbon bar:

References

External links
Generals of World War II

1892 births
1961 deaths
Military personnel from Rochester, New York
United States Army generals
United States Army personnel of World War I
United States Military Academy alumni
United States Army Command and General Staff College alumni
United States Army War College alumni
Recipients of the Distinguished Service Cross (United States)
Recipients of the Distinguished Service Medal (US Army)
Recipients of the Croix de Guerre 1914–1918 (France)
Graduates of the United States Military Academy Class of 1915
United States Army generals of World War II
United States Army Field Artillery Branch personnel